Igor Rossi Branco or Igor Rossi for short (born 10 March 1989 in Campinas, São Paulo) is a Brazilian professional footballer, who plays for Al-Ittihad Kalba, as a centre-back. In addition to playing centre-back, Rossi can also play at left-back. He has previously played for Internacional, Marítimo, Heart of Midlothian and Al-Faisaly.

Football career
Igor Rossi began his career in Internacional. In 2010, moved to Marítimo, and started to play in the Marítimo's B team. At the end of the 2010–11 season, Igor Rossi was promoted to the first team.

After being included as an un-used substitute in the opening game of the season against Beira-Mar, Igor Rossi made his debut for the senior team in the Primeira Liga on 11 December 2011, in a 1–0 against Benfica. Rossi later made five appearances in the 2011–12 season.

In the 2012–13 season, Igor was included in the 25 man squad. Igor then scored his first goal in a game against Benfica. In his final season before being released, he played only four matches – two as a starter – and ten for the reserves in Segunda Liga.

On 22 July 2015, he signed a one-year deal at Heart of Midlothian, newly returned to the Scottish Premiership. He made his debut eight days later in the first round of the season's Scottish League Cup at home against Arbroath, replacing double goalscorer Osman Sow for the final 13 minutes of a 4–2 victory. On 2 August he played the full 90 minutes of his first league game, a 4–3 win against St Johnstone.

Rossi moved to Saudi club Al-Faisaly Harmah in January 2017. On 20 July 2022, Rossi joined Emirati side Al-Ittihad Kalba on a free transfer.

Personal life
His younger brother, Raphael, is also a defender, who plays for Polish club Radomiak Radom.

Career statistics

As of 6 February 2023

Honours

Club
Al-Faisaly
King Cup: 2020–21

References

External links

1989 births
Living people
Brazilian people of Italian descent
Sportspeople from Campinas
Brazilian footballers
Association football defenders
Sport Club Internacional players
C.S. Marítimo players
Heart of Midlothian F.C. players
Al-Faisaly FC players
Al-Ittihad Kalba SC players
Campeonato Brasileiro Série A players
Primeira Liga players
Scottish Professional Football League players
Saudi Professional League players
UAE Pro League players
Brazilian expatriate footballers
Brazilian expatriate sportspeople in Portugal
Brazilian expatriate sportspeople in Scotland
Brazilian expatriate sportspeople in Saudi Arabia
Brazilian expatriate sportspeople in the United Arab Emirates
Expatriate footballers in Portugal
Expatriate footballers in Scotland
Expatriate footballers in Saudi Arabia
Expatriate footballers in the United Arab Emirates